Yaqui typically refers to the Yaqui people.

It can also refer to:

People
 Pascua Yaqui Tribe, a federally recognized tribe of Yaqui people in Arizona
 Texas Band of Yaqui Indians, a nonprofit organization in Texas
 Yaqui López (b. 1951), Mexican boxer

Culture
 Yaqui language
 Yaqui music

Places
 Yaqui River in Sonora, Mexico

Other
 Yaqui Uprising, 1896 conflict to overthrow Porfirio Díaz
 Yaqui Wars, ongoing conflicts with New Spain/Mexico with Yaqui Indians
 Yaquis de Obregón, a Mexican baseball team

See also
Yaquina (disambiguation)